Brigadier Guy Bomford (1899-1996) was a British geodesist.
He worked at the Survey of India and the Corps of Royal Engineers. In 1947 he was appointed as reader in surveying and geodesy at the University of Oxford, holding this post until his retirement in 1966.
In 1952 he published a book titled Geodesy, which became widely circulated.
From 1963 to 1967 he served as president of the International Association of Geodesy.

References

Further reading
 A Tribute to Brigadier Guy Bomford 
 

1899 births
1996 deaths
Academics of the University of Oxford
British geodesists
Royal Engineers